Erwin Albert (born 27 March 1954) is a German former professional footballer who played as a forward.

Honours
K.S.K. Beveren
 Belgian First Division A: 1978–79, 1983–84
 Belgian Cup: 1982–83
 Belgian Super Cup: 1979, 1984
 European Cup Winners' Cup: semi-finalist 1978–79

1. FC Schweinfurt 05
 Bayernliga: 1989–90

Individual
 Belgian First Division A top scorer: 1978–79 (28 goals)

External links
 
 

1954 births
Living people
German footballers
Association football midfielders
Bundesliga players
Belgian Pro League players
Hertha BSC players
K.S.K. Beveren players
1. FC Schweinfurt 05 players
German expatriate footballers
German expatriate sportspeople in Belgium
Expatriate footballers in Belgium
20th-century German people